Colin Chase (April 13, 1886 – April 25, 1937) was an American silent film actor.

Biography
Born in 1886 in Lewiston, Idaho, Chase signed for his first film role in 1915 and starred in about 45 films. In 1916, he signed a long-term contract with the Morosco-Pallas company.

Chase often was cast as a villain in Westerns, sometimes being billed as Bud Chase. As a supporting player with Fox and other studios, he made the transition to sound films. He had been a cartoonist for a newspaper in Chicago and had performed in vaudeville.

Chase died on April 25, 1937, a week after he became paralyzed, in Sawtelle, California.

Partial filmography
 Father and the Boys (1915)
 The Grip of Jealousy (1916)
 Tangled Hearts (1916)
 The Making of Maddalena (1916)
 The Parson of Panamint (1916)
 The Road to Love (1916)
 The Right Direction (1916)
 Her Own People (1917)
 The Spirit of Romance (1917)
 The Bond Between (1917)
 A Strange Transgressor (1917)
 A Branded Soul (1917)
 Ace High (1918)
 Wives and Other Wives (1918)
 Bucking the Barrier (1923)
 Snowdrift (1923)
 The Godless Girl (1929)
 The Air Legion (1929)
 Big News (1929)
 The Lone Star Ranger (1930)
 The Vanishing Riders (1935)

References

External links

 

1886 births
1937 deaths
American male silent film actors
Male actors from Idaho
People from Lewiston, Idaho
20th-century American male actors
Male Western (genre) film actors